Schiavon is a town in the province of Vicenza, Veneto, Italy. SP248 goes through the town.

Twin towns
Schiavon is twinned with:

  Monte Belo do Sul, Brazil

References

Cities and towns in Veneto